The 2021 Supercopa do Brasil (officially the Supercopa Kia 2021 for sponsorship reasons) was the fourth edition of Supercopa do Brasil, an annual football match played between the champions of the Campeonato Brasileiro Série A and Copa do Brasil.

The match was played at the Estádio Nacional Mané Garrincha in Brasília on 11 April 2021. Flamengo and Palmeiras qualified after winning the 2020 Campeonato Brasileiro Série A and the 2020 Copa do Brasil, respectively.

The match finished in a 2–2 draw, but Flamengo clinched their second title by winning 6–5 on penalties.

Qualified teams

Match

Details

References 

Supercopa do Brasil
2021 in Brazilian football
CR Flamengo matches
Sociedade Esportiva Palmeiras matches
April 2021 sports events in South America
Supercopa do Brasil 2021